La Tsavre (also known as Mont Ferret) is a mountain of the Swiss Pennine Alps, overlooking Ferret in the canton of Valais. With a height of 2,978 metres above sea level, it is the highest summit of the Combe de l'A, a small valley between the Val Ferret and the Val d'Entremont.

References

External links
 La Tsavre on Hikr

Mountains of the Alps
Mountains of Switzerland
Mountains of Valais
Two-thousanders of Switzerland